Rat a Tat Tat is the fifth solo album by Jason Collett of Broken Social Scene. The album was released on March 9, 2010 from record label Arts & Crafts.

The album was produced by Carlin Nicholson and Michael O'Brien of Toronto-based band Zeus, the album features guest musicians Andrew Whiteman, Tony Scherr and Liam O'Neil of The Stills.

In promotion of the album, the label released songs, "Love Is a Dirty Word", in MP3 format.

The album was a longlisted nominee for the 2010 Polaris Music Prize, but it lost to Les Chemins de verre.

"Rat a Tat Tat" placed third in Exclaim! Magazine's annual musical rankings for top Folk & Country albums of 2010. Collett was praised for his irreverence in music making, "this time around, his raspy drawl is a little twangier and his retro detailing a little glossier. Although he pays homage to myriad bygone musical styles, Collett adds a tart twist that turns familiar echoes into fresh sounds."

Track listing
 "Rave On Sad Songs"
 "Lake Superior"
 "Love Is a Dirty Word"
 "Bitch City"
 "High Summer"
 "Cold Blue Halo"
 "Love Is a Chain
 "Long May You Love"
 "The Slowest Dance"
 "Winnipeg Winds"
 "Vanderpool Vanderpool"

References

2010 albums
Jason Collett albums
Arts & Crafts Productions albums